Radoslav Presinsky (born 14 January 1989) is a Slovak male volleyball player. He is part of the Slovakia men's national volleyball team. He competed at the 2015 European Games in Baku. On club level he plays for Aero Odolena Voda.

References

1989 births
Living people
Slovak men's volleyball players
Volleyball players at the 2015 European Games
European Games competitors for Slovakia
Place of birth missing (living people)
Slovak expatriate sportspeople in the Czech Republic
Expatriate volleyball players in the Czech Republic